Monteocha is an unincorporated rural community in northern Alachua County, Florida, near the Santa Fe River. A post office was opened in Monteocha in 1889, and closed in 1913. The Homowo-Afi African Cultural and Educational Festival has been held annually in Monteocha since 2005. Alachua County's Monteocha Park is located in the neighboring community of Gordon.

Notes

Maps
 
 

Unincorporated communities in Florida
Alachua County, Florida